Handcar Peak is a  mountain summit located in the Railroad Group of the Coast Mountains, in the Pemberton Valley of southwestern British Columbia, Canada. Precipitation runoff from the peak drains into Sampson Creek and Buck Creek which are both tributaries of the Lillooet River. The mountain's name was proposed in 1978 by mountaineer Karl Ricker of the Alpine Club of Canada, in association with Railroad Pass, Railroad Creek and other railroad-related names of the immediate vicinity. The toponym was officially adopted January 23, 1979, by the Geographical Names Board of Canada.


Climate
Based on the Köppen climate classification, Handcar Peak is located in a subarctic climate zone of western North America. Most weather fronts originate in the Pacific Ocean, and travel east toward the Coast Mountains where they are forced upward by the range (Orographic lift), causing them to drop their moisture in the form of rain or snowfall. As a result, the Coast Mountains experience high precipitation, especially during the winter months in the form of snowfall. Winter temperatures can drop below −20 °C with wind chill factors below −30 °C. This climate supports the Siding Glacier on the peak's north slope. The months July through September offer the most favorable weather for climbing Handcar Peak.

See also

 Geography of British Columbia
 Geology of British Columbia

Gallery

References

External links
 Weather: Handcar Peak 

Two-thousanders of British Columbia
Pacific Ranges
Lillooet Land District
Coast Mountains
Pemberton Valley